The 1963 ECAC Hockey Men's Ice Hockey Tournament was the 2nd tournament in league history. It was played between March 5 and March 9, 1963. Quarterfinal games were played at home team campus sites, while the 'final four' games were played at the Boston Arena in Boston, Massachusetts. By reaching the championship game both Harvard and Boston College received invitations to participate in the 1963 NCAA Men's Ice Hockey Tournament. Harvard, however, declined the invitation and was replaced by Clarkson who won the third place game. This is the only time that the winner of the ECAC tournament has not made an appearance in the NCAA tournament. (as of 2014)

Format
The tournament featured three rounds of play, all of which were single-elimination. The top eight teams, based on conference rankings, qualified to participate in the tournament. In the quarterfinals the first seed and eighth seed, the second seed and seventh seed, the third seed and sixth seed and the fourth seed and fifth seed played against one another. In the semifinals, the winner of the first and eighth matchup played the winner of the fourth and fifth matchup while the other two remaining teams played with the winners advancing to the championship game and the losers advancing to the third place game.

Conference standings
Note: GP = Games played; W = Wins; L = Losses; T = Ties; Pct. = Winning percentage; GF = Goals for; GA = Goals against

Bracket

Note: * denotes overtime period(s)

Quarterfinals

(1) Boston College vs. (8) Army

(2) Clarkson vs. (7) Brown

(3) Harvard vs. (6) Colgate

(4) St. Lawrence vs. (5) Providence

Semifinals

(1) Boston College vs. (4) St. Lawrence

(2) Clarkson vs. (3) Harvard

Third Place

(2) Clarkson vs. (4) St. Lawrence

Championship

(1) Boston College vs. (3) Harvard

Tournament awards

All-Tournament Team

First Team
F Jack Leetch (Boston College)
F Corby Adams (Clarkson)
F Gene Kinasewich* (Harvard)
D Pat Brophy (Clarkson)
D David Johnston (Harvard)
G Tom Apprille (Boston College)
* Most Outstanding Player(s)

Second Team
F Tim Taylor (Harvard)
F Bill Hogan (Boston College)
F Ron Mason (St. Lawrence)
D Cal Wagner (Clarkson)
D Jack Callahan (Boston College)
G Godfrey Wood (Harvard)

References

External links
ECAC Hockey
1962–63 ECAC Hockey Standings
1962–63 NCAA Standings

ECAC Hockey Men's Ice Hockey Tournament
ECAC tournament